Erich Anton Paul von Däniken (born 14 April 1935) is a Swiss  author of several books which make claims about extraterrestrial influences on early human culture, including the best-selling Chariots of the Gods?, published in 1968. Von Däniken is one of the main figures responsible for popularizing the "paleo-contact" and ancient astronauts hypotheses.

The ideas put forth in his books are rejected by virtually all scientists and academics, who categorize his work as pseudohistory, pseudoarchaeology, and pseudoscience. Early in his career, he was convicted and served time for several counts of fraud or embezzlement, and wrote one of his books in prison.

Von Däniken later became a co-founder of the Archaeology, Astronautics and SETI Research Association (AAS RA). He designed Mystery Park (now known as Jungfrau Park), a theme park located in Interlaken, Switzerland, that opened in May 2003.

Early life
Von Däniken was born in Zofingen, Aargau. Brought up as a Roman Catholic, he attended the Saint-Michel International Catholic School in Fribourg, Switzerland. During his time at the school he rejected the church's interpretations of the Bible and developed an interest in astronomy and flying saucers. At the age of 19, he was given a four-month suspended sentence for theft. He left the school and was apprenticed to a Swiss hotelier for a time, before moving to Egypt. In December 1964, von Däniken wrote  ("Were Our Ancestors Visited from Space?") for the German-Canadian periodical . While in Egypt, he was involved in a jewelry deal which resulted in a nine-month conviction for fraud and embezzlement upon his return to Switzerland.

Following his release, von Däniken became a manager of the Hotel Rosenhügel in Davos, Switzerland, during which time he wrote Chariots of the Gods? (literally "Memories of the Future"), working on the manuscript late at night after the hotel's guests had retired. The draft of the book was turned down by several publishers. Econ Verlag (now part of Ullstein Verlag) was willing to publish the book after a complete reworking by a professional author, Utz Utermann, who used the pseudonym of Wilhelm Roggersdorf. Utermann was a former editor of the Nazi Party's newspaper  and had been a Nazi bestselling author. The re-write of Chariots of the Gods? was accepted for publication early in 1967, but not printed until March 1968. Against all expectations, the book gained widespread interest and became a bestseller. Von Däniken was paid 7 percent of the book's turnover, while 3 percent went to Utermann. In 1970,  referred to the hype over Däniken as Dänikitis.

In November 1968, von Däniken was arrested for fraud, after falsifying hotel records and credit references in order to take out loans for $130,000 over a period of twelve years. He used the money for foreign travel to research his book. Two years later, von Däniken was convicted for "repeated and sustained" embezzlement, fraud, and forgery, with the court ruling that the writer had been living a "playboy" lifestyle. He unsuccessfully entered a plea of nullity, on the grounds that his intentions were not malicious and that the credit institutions were at fault for failing adequately to research his references, and on 13 February 1970 he was sentenced to three and a half years imprisonment and was also fined 3,000 francs. He served one year of this sentence before being released.

His first book, Chariots of the Gods?, had been published by the time of his trial, and its sales allowed him to repay his debts and leave the hotel business. Von Däniken wrote his second book, Gods from Outer Space, while in prison.

Claims of alien influence on Earth
The general claim of von Däniken over several published books, starting with Chariots of the Gods? in 1968, is that extraterrestrials or "ancient astronauts" visited Earth and influenced early human culture. Von Däniken writes about his belief that structures such as the Egyptian pyramids, Stonehenge, and the Moai of Easter Island, and certain artifacts from that period, are products of higher technological knowledge than is presumed to have existed at the times they were manufactured. He also describes ancient artwork throughout the world as containing depictions of astronauts, air and space vehicles, extraterrestrials, and complex technology. Von Däniken explains the origins of religions as reactions to contact with an alien race, and offers interpretations of sections of the Old Testament of the Bible.

Criticism
In 1966, when von Däniken was writing his first book, scientists Carl Sagan and I. S. Shklovskii wrote about the possibility of paleocontact and extraterrestrial visitation claims in one chapter of their book Intelligent Life in the Universe, leading author Ronald Story to speculate in his book The Space-gods Revealed that this may have been the genesis of von Däniken's ideas. Many ideas from this book appeared in different form in Däniken's books.

Prior to von Däniken's work, other authors had presented ideas of extraterrestrial contacts. He has failed to credit these authors properly or at all, even when making the same claims using similar or identical evidence. The first edition of von Däniken's Erinnerungen an die Zukunft failed to cite Robert Charroux's One Hundred Thousand Years of Man's Unknown History despite making very similar claims, and publisher Econ-Verlag was forced to add Charroux in the bibliography in later editions, to avoid a possible lawsuit for plagiarism.

Logical and factual errors

Iron pillar of Delhi
In Chariots of the Gods?, von Däniken cited the Iron pillar of Delhi in India, erected approximately 402 CE, as a prime example of extraterrestrial influence because of its "unknown origins" and a complete absence of rust despite its estimated 1,500 years of continuous exposure to the elements. When informed by an interviewer, in 1974, that the pillar was not rust-free, and that its origin, method of construction, and relative resistance to corrosion were all well understood, von Däniken responded that he no longer believed extraterrestrials had been involved in its creation.

Cueva de los Tayos
In The Gold of the Gods, von Däniken describes an expedition that he undertook through man-made tunnels within Cueva de los Tayos, a natural cave system in Ecuador, guided by a local man named Juan Moricz. He reported seeing mounds of gold, strange statues, and a library containing metal tablets, all of which he considered to be evidence of ancient extraterrestrial visitation.

Moricz told Der Spiegel that there had been no expedition; von Däniken's descriptions came from "a long conversation", and the photos in the book had been "fiddled". During the 1974 interview, von Däniken asserted that he had indeed seen the library and the artifacts in the tunnels, but he had embellished some aspects of the story to make it more interesting. "In German we say a writer, if he is not writing pure science, is allowed to use some dramaturgische Effekte – some theatrical effects," he said. "And that's what I have done." A geologist found no evidence of artificial tunnels in the area. Father Crespi's gold artifacts, according to an archeologist consulted by Der Spiegel, were mostly brass imitations sold locally as tourist souvenirs.

Book of Dzyan and "Tulli Papyrus"
Samuel Rosenberg said that the Book of Dzyan, referred to by von Däniken, was "a fabrication superimposed on a gigantic hoax concocted by Madame Blavatsky." He also says that the "Tulli Papyrus", cited by von Däniken in one of his books, is probably cribbed from the Book of Ezekiel, and quoted Nolli (through Walter Ramberg, Scientific Attache at the U.S. Embassy in Rome), then current Director of the Egyptian Section of the Vatican Museum, as "suspect[ing] that Tulli was taken in and that the papyrus is a fake." According to Richard R. Lingeman of The New York Times, it is likely that von Däniken obtained these references from UFO books that mentioned them as real documents.

Nazca Lines

Von Däniken brought the Nazca Lines to public prominence in Chariots of the Gods? with his proposal that the lines were built on instructions from extraterrestrial beings as airfields for their spaceships. In his 1998 book Arrival of The Gods, he added that some of the pictures depicted extraterrestrials. The idea did not originate with von Däniken; it began after people who first saw the lines from the air made joking comparisons to Martian "canals", and had already been published by others.

Descriptions of some Nazca line photos in Chariots of the Gods? contain significant inaccuracies. One, for example, purporting to demonstrate markings of a modern airport, was actually the knee joint of one of the bird figures, and was quite small. Von Däniken said that this was an "error" in the first edition, but it has not been corrected in later editions.

Consensus among archeologists is that the Nazca lines were created by pre-Columbian civilizations for cultural purposes.  Efforts by archeologists to refute fringe theories such as Däniken's have been minimal, however. Silverman and Proulx have said that this silence from archaeologists has harmed the profession, as well as the Peruvian nation. Von Däniken's books attracted so many tourists to the Nazca region that researcher Maria Reiche had to spend much of her own time and money preserving the lines.

Piri Reis map

Von Däniken wrote in Chariots of the Gods? that a version of the Piri Reis map depicted some Antarctic mountains that were and still are buried in ice, and could only be mapped with modern equipment. His theory relies on the book of Maps of the Ancient Sea Kings by Charles Hapgood. A.D. Crown, in Some Trust in Chariots, explains how this is simply wrong. The map in von Däniken's book only extends five degrees south of the equator, ending in Cape São Roque, which means that it does not extend to Antarctica. Von Däniken also said that the map showed some distortions that would only happen if it was an aerial view taken from a spaceship flying above El Cairo, but in fact it does not extend far enough to the south to cause visible distortions in an aerial view. Von Däniken also asserts the existence of a legend saying that a god gave the map to a priest, the god being an extraterrestrial being. But Piri Reis said that he had drawn that map himself using older maps, and the map is consistent with the cartographic knowledge of that time. Also, the map is not "absolutely accurate" as claimed by von Däniken, since it contains many errors and omissions; a fact that von Däniken did not correct when he covered the map again in his 1998 book Odyssey of the Gods. Other authors had already published this same idea, a fact that von Däniken did not recognize until 1974 in an interview with Playboy magazine.

Pyramid of Cheops

Erich von Däniken puts forward many beliefs about the Great Pyramid of Giza in his 1968 book Chariots of the Gods?, saying that the ancient Egyptians could not have built it, not having sufficiently advanced tools, leaving no evidence of workers, and incorporating too much 'intimate' knowledge about the Earth and its geography into the design. To date, the technique of construction is not well understood and the tools the Egyptians used are not entirely known; however, marks left in the quarries by those tools are still visible, and many examples of possible tools are preserved in museums.

Von Däniken claims that it would have taken the Egyptians too long to cut all the blocks necessary and drag them to the construction site in time to build the Great Pyramid in only 20 years; and a Nova documentary failed to demonstrate the proposed construction method, and came to no conclusions about how long the theoretical technique would require to construct the monument. The documentary does not actually demonstrate the cutting or transportation of a true 2.5 ton block but instead has actors portray the theory by pushing what is a prop rock on a prop sled based on an ancient sled that was discovered in Egypt.

Von Däniken also said that there were too many problems with their tools, and, according to him, the Egyptians had no prehistory so they could not have possibly built these large pyramids, even though there are pyramids in Egypt that were built before the Great Pyramid. Because he believed that there was no prehistory, von Däniken put forward that there is nothing known about how, when, or why these pyramids were built.

Von Däniken also claims that Egyptians built perfect pyramids from the beginning, but numerous pyramid precursors survive, showing the errors made and corrected by Egyptian architects while they were perfecting the technique. These include simple mastabas, the Step Pyramid of Djoser, and the so-called Bent Pyramid.

In his book, he says that there is no evidence of Egyptian workers at the pyramid site; however, archaeologists have found evidence of buildings where workers would have lived, with bakeries and sewer systems. There are also tombs of workers, with some of the skeletons showing evidence of having received medical care. This may indicate the workers were well taken care of, which suggests they were Egyptian.

Von Däniken states that the Great Pyramid is located on the Median line dividing the continents, and that the Egyptians could not have aligned the edges so perfectly to true north without advanced technology that only aliens could give them. Egyptian builders, however, knew of simple methods to find north via star observation. Egyptologists have found artifacts and drawings of an object called a merkhet, which enabled the ancient Egyptians to find true north using the North Star and other stars aligned with the merkhet. The ancient Egyptian astronomers and, possibly, farmers spent much time studying the stars in order to accurately track the agricultural seasons.

Sarcophagus of Palenque

Von Däniken claimed that the Sarcophagus of Palenque depicted a spaceman sitting on a rocket-powered spaceship, wearing a spacesuit. However, archaeologists see nothing special about the figure, a dead Maya monarch (K'inich Janaab' Pakal) wearing traditional Maya hairstyle and jewellery, surrounded by Maya symbols that can be observed in other Maya drawings. The right hand is not handling any rocket controls, but simply making a traditional Maya gesture that other figures in the sides of the lid also make, and is not holding anything. The rocket shape is actually two serpents joining their heads at the bottom, with the rocket "flames" being the beards of the serpents. The rocket motor under the figure is the face of a monster, symbol of the underworld. (In Chariots of the Gods? Von Däniken also incorrectly states the sculpture to be from Copán, rather than Palenque.)

Peruvian stones
Von Däniken put forward photographs of the Ica stones, ancient stones in Peru, with carvings of men using telescopes, detailed world maps, and advanced medical operations, all beyond the knowledge of ancient Peruvians. But the PBS television series Nova determined that the stones were modern, and located the potter who made them. This potter makes stones daily and sells them to tourists. Von Däniken had visited the potter and examined the stones himself, but he didn't mention this in his book. He says that he didn't believe the potter when he said that he had made the stones. Von Däniken says that he asked Doctor Cabrera, a local surgeon who owns the museum, and Cabrera had told him that the potter's claims were a lie and that the stones were ancient. But the potter had proof that Cabrera had thanked him for providing the stones for the museum. Von Däniken claimed that the stones at the museum were very different from those made by the potter, but the Nova reporters oversaw the manufacturing of one stone and confirmed that it was very similar to those in the museum.

European ethnocentrism
Kenneth Feder accused von Däniken of European ethnocentrism, while John Flenley and Paul Bahn suggested that views such as his interpretation of the Easter Island statues "ignore the real achievements of our ancestors and constitute the ultimate in racism: they belittle the abilities and ingenuity of the human species as a whole."

Other criticisms
Ronald Story published The Space Gods Revealed: A Close Look At The Theories of Erich Von Däniken in 1976, written in response to the evidence presented in von Däniken's Chariots of the Gods?. It was reviewed as "a coherent and much-needed refutation of von Däniken's theories". Archeologist Clifford Wilson wrote two books similarly debunking von Däniken: Crash Go the Chariots in 1972 and The Chariots Still Crash in 1975.

A 2004 article in Skeptic Magazine states that von Däniken took many of the book's concepts from The Morning of the Magicians, that this book in turn was heavily influenced by the Cthulhu Mythos, and that the core of the ancient astronaut theory originates in H. P. Lovecraft's stories "The Call of Cthulhu" written in 1926, and At the Mountains of Madness written in 1931.

Jason Colavito (who has made or echoed some of the criticisms above) has criticized von Däniken's book Signs of the Gods 1979 for what he describes as making very racist claims while speculating that ancient aliens created varying human races.

Popularity
According to von Däniken, books in his series have altogether been translated into 32 languages and have sold more than 63 million copies.

Based on von Däniken's books a comic book Die Götter aus dem All has been created by Bogusław Polch written by Arnold Mostowicz and Alfred Górny. In 1978–1982 eight comic books were translated into 12 languages and have sold over 5 million copies.

Jungfrau Park located near Interlaken, Switzerland, was opened as the Mystery Park in 2003. Designed by von Däniken, it explored several great "mysteries" of the world.

Ridley Scott said that his film Prometheus is related to some of von Däniken's ideas regarding early human civilization. Reviewing the two-disc DVD release of Roland Emmerich's film Stargate, Dean Devlin referred to the "Is There a Stargate?" feature where "author Erich von Däniken discusses evidence he has found of alien visitations to Earth."

Von Däniken is an occasional presenter on the History Channel and H2 show Ancient Aliens, where he talks about aspects of his theories as they pertain to each episode.

Books
 Chariots of the Gods? (Souvenir Press Ltd, 1969)
 Return to the Stars (Souvenir Press Ltd, 1970) 
 Gods from Outer Space (Bantam,1972; reprint of Return to the Stars)
 
 Miracles of the Gods: A Hard Look at the Supernatural (Souvenir Press Ltd, 1975) 
 In Search of Ancient Gods: My Pictorial Evidence for the Impossible (Corgi books, 1976) 
 According to the Evidence (Souvenir Press, 1977) 
 Signs of the Gods (Corgi books, 1980) 
 The Stones of Kiribati: Pathways to the Gods (Corgi books, 1982) 
 The Gods and their Grand Design: The Eighth Wonder of the World (Souvenir Press, 1984) 
 The Eyes of the Sphinx: The Newest Evidence of Extraterrestrial Contact (Berkley Publishing Corporation, 1996) 
 The Return of the Gods: Evidence of Extraterrestrial Visitations (Element, 1998) 
 Arrival of the Gods: Revealing the Alien Landing Sites of Nazca (Element, 1998) 
 The Gods Were Astronauts: Evidence of the True Identities of the Old "Gods" (Vega books, 2001) 
 Odyssey of the Gods: An Alien History of Ancient Greece (Vega books, 2002) 
 History Is Wrong (New Page books, 2009) 
 Evidence of the Gods (New Page books, 2010) 
 Twilight of the Gods: The Mayan Calendar and the Return of the Extraterrestrials (New Page books, 2010) 
 Tomy and the Planet of Lies (Tantor eBooks, 2012) 
 Remnants of the Gods: A Visual Tour of Alien Influence in Egypt, Spain, France, Turkey, and Italy (New Page Books, 2013) 
 The Gods Never Left Us (New Page Books, 2018) 
 Eyewitness to the Gods (New Page Books, 2019) 
 War of the Gods (New Page Books, 2020) 
 Confessions of an Egyptologist: Lost Libraries, Vanished Labyrinths & the Astonishing Truth Under the Saqqara Pyramids (New Page Books, 2021)

German language
 Erinnerungen an die Zukunft (1968)
 Zurück zu den Sternen: Argumente für das Unmögliche (1969) 
 
 Strategie der Götter: Das Achte Weltwunder (1982) 
 Der Tag an dem die Götter kamen (1984) 
 Habe ich mich geirrt? (1985) 
 Wir alle sind Kinder der Götter (1987) C. Bertelsmann, 
 Die Augen der Sphinx (1989) C. Bertelsmann, 
 Die Spuren der Ausserirdischen (1990) (Bildband) 
 Die Steinzeit war ganz anders (1991) 
 Ausserirdische in Ägypten (1991)
 Erinnerungen an die Zukunft (1992) (Reissue with new foreword)
 Der Götter-Schock (1992) 
 Raumfahrt im Altertum (1993) 
 Auf den Spuren der Allmächtigen (1993) C. Bertelsmann, 
 Botschaften und Zeichen aus dem Universum (1994) C. Bertelsmann, 
 Im Name von Zeus (2001) C. Bertelsmann, 
 Götterdämmerung (2009) KOPP Verlag 
 Grüße aus der Steinzeit: Wer nicht glauben will, soll sehen! (2010)
 Was ist falsch im Maya-Land?: Versteckte Technologien in Tempeln und Skulpturen (2011)
 Was ich jahrzehntelang verschwiegen habe (2015)

Films
 Ferry Radax: Mit Erich von Däniken in Peru (With Erich von Däniken in Peru, 1982). A documentary.
 Daniken: a video song directed by Samik Roy Choudhury, sung by Rupam Islam of West Bengal, India

Comic books 
 Landung in den Anden (1978), 
 Atlantis – Experimente mit Menschen und Monstern (1978), 
 Krieg der Feuerwagen – Report einer Invasion (1978), 
 Revolte der Titanen (1978), 
 Der Untergang von Atlantis – Die Rache der Götter (1978), 
 Als Sodom und Gomorrha starben (1978), 
 Das Geheimnis der Pyramide (1982), 
 Als die Sonne still stand (1982),

See also
 David Icke
 Frauds, Myths, and Mysteries: Science and Pseudoscience in Archaeology (book)
 Graham Hancock
 Mauro Biglino
 Oolon Colluphid
 Zecharia Sitchin

Further reading
 Peter Krassa, Disciple of the Gods: A biography of Erich von Däniken (W. H. Allen & Unwin, 1976).

References

Sources

External links

 Erich von Däniken's official homepage
 

Ancient astronauts proponents
Esoteric anthropogenesis
Living people
Mythographers
New Age writers
People convicted of fraud
People from Zofingen
Pseudoarchaeologists
Pseudohistorians
Ufologists
1935 births
20th-century Swiss writers
21st-century Swiss writers
Collège Saint-Michel alumni